Uato-Lari (Watu-Lari, Watulari, Hato-Lari, Uatolari, Uatolári, Uatulari, Uatu-Lari), officially Uato-Lari Administrative Post, is an administrative post (and was formerly a subdistrict) in Viqueque municipality, East Timor.

References

Further reading

External links 

  – information page on Ministry of State Administration site 

Administrative posts of East Timor
Viqueque Municipality